Brown Wardle is a hill between the village of Wardle, Greater Manchester and the town of Whitworth, Lancashire, England. The summit is on the border of Greater Manchester and Lancashire and stands 400 m (1,312 ft) above sea level, making it one of the highest points in Rochdale and Greater Manchester. It forms part of the South Pennines, lying within the historic county boundaries of Lancashire.

Hang gliding sites
Mountains and hills of Greater Manchester
Mountains and hills of Lancashire